The Intersputnik International Organization of Space Communications, commonly known as Intersputnik, is an international satellite communications services organization founded on 15 November 1971, in Moscow by the Soviet Union along with a group of eight formerly socialist states (Poland, Czechoslovakia, East Germany, Hungary, Romania, Bulgaria, Mongolia, and Cuba).

The objective was and continues to be the development and common use of communications satellites. It was created as the Eastern Bloc's response to the Western Intelsat organization. As of 2008 the organization has 25 member states, among them the Federal Republic of Germany as the legal successor of the GDR.

Intersputnik nowadays is a commercially aligned organization. It operates 12 satellites in orbit and 41 transponders. In June 1997 Intersputnik created the Lockheed Martin Intersputnik (LMI) joint venture together with Lockheed Martin, which built and operated the satellites of the same name. In September 2006, Lockheed Martin Intersputnik was acquired by Asia Broadcast Satellite (ABS).

History 
Initially, the Intersputnik system was created on the basis of the Soviet Orbit-2 satellite broadcasting network and was designed to serve the countries participating in the Council for Mutual Economic Assistance (Comecon). The main system and technical developments were carried out by NIIR, radio receiving equipment was produced at the Moscow Radio Engineering Plant, antenna-feeder devices at the Podolsk Electromechanical Plant, radio transmitting and channel-forming equipment was manufactured by the Krasnoyarsk TV Plant.

In the initial version, Intersputnik used highly elliptical satellites of the Molniya-3 type, and in 1978 it began using geostationary satellites of the Gorizont type. Receiving complexes "Orbita-2" with transmitters "Gradient-K" and channel-forming equipment RS-1, RS-2 operated at the earth stations. In the process of modernization, the transmitters were replaced by more modern Helikon type with a power of 3 kW and new channel-forming equipment “Gradient-N” began to be used. Subsequently, the Budapest Long Distance Telecommunications Institute (TKI) took part in the development of the equipment for Intersputnik, and factories in Hungary and Czechoslovakia were connected to production.

Member states 

 
 
 
 
 
 
 
 
  (As the legal successor to the GDR)

See also 
 Ground stations
 Communications satellite
 Submarine communications cable
 European Telecommunications Satellite Organization

References

External links 

Agreement on the legal capacity, privileges and immunities, Berlin, 20 September 1976
satnews.com 
english.pravda.ru
un.org
dlr.de

Communications satellites
Science and technology in the Soviet Union
Space program of the Soviet Union
Soviet and Russian space institutions
Aerospace companies of the Soviet Union
Foreign relations of the Soviet Union
Eastern Bloc
East Germany–Soviet Union relations
Poland–Soviet Union relations
Hungary–Soviet Union relations
Czechoslovakia–Soviet Union relations
Cuba–Soviet Union relations
Romania–Soviet Union relations
Soviet Union–Syria relations
India–Soviet Union relations
1971 establishments in the Soviet Union
Bulgaria–Soviet Union relations
Communications in the Soviet Union
Communications satellites of Russia